The Grand Elegance is an American psychedelic blues band from Long Beach, California formed in 1997.

Personnel
Vocals—Warren Thomas (The Abigails (Burger Records))
Guitar—Kyle Mullarky (The Abigails, The Shore, Starlite Desperation)
Keyboards—Chris Badger (VUM, Everlovely Lightningheart (Hydrahead Records))
Drums—Anthony Matarazzo (Some Days, FM Bats, Jail Weddings)
Guitar—Orlando Sanchez (FM Bats, Parade's End, I'm Gonna Stab You)

Discography

Singles & EP's
(2000) - Vicious Circles (EP) (Prime Directive Records)
(2002) - The Sex (single) (Prime Directive Records)

Albums
(2006) - Warm Summer Nights (The Weather Machine, Prime Directive Records)
(2009) "Cold Winter Dreams"

External links
Official website
Prime Directive Records - Label
VUM - VUM

1997 establishments in California
Musical groups established in 1997
Psychedelic rock music groups from California